It is impossible to say how many flute sonatas were composed by George Frideric Handel, but the correct number is somewhere between none and eight. There are many reasons for the confusion: some of the sonatas were originally written for other instruments, some have uncertain authenticity, some contain borrowings from other Handel works, and some were published (in an altered form) without Handel's knowledge. At least six of the sonatas are known to contain music written by Handel, although he may not have intended some of them to have been played by the flute.

The main source of the sonatas is the c.   1730 publication Sonates pour un traversiere un violin ou hautbois con basso continuo composées par G. F. Handel, allegedly by the Amsterdam publisher Jeanne Roger (who had died in December 1722), however the publication was made by the printer John Walsh. In 1732 Walsh published a revised version under his own name.

Three sonatas attributed to Handel were published by Walsh in 1730 as part of a collection titled Six Solos, Four for a German Flute and a Bass and two for a Violin with a Thorough Bass. It was supposed that they were early works composed by Handel before 1703 in Halle but their authenticity is now considered doubtful. The supposition of the date has been proven unfounded, at least for the second sonata, three movements of which are arrangements of music known to have been composed by Handel after 1712.

Of the eleven flute sonatas formerly attributed to Handel, only one (the flute sonata in E minor (HWV 379)) appears to have been intended for the flute as it exists in that form in Handel's autograph, and even that one is a hasty arrangement of movements from other works.

The flute sonata in D major (HWV 378), which was attributed in a manuscript to Johann Sigismund Weiss (brother of the lutenist Sylvius Leopold Weiss), has been proffered as a work by Handel, however no autograph version by Handel is known to exist.

List of flute sonatas
The following are the eight candidates for being flute sonatas by Handel:

See also
List of solo sonatas by George Frideric Handel
Handel solo sonatas (Walsh)
XV Handel solo sonatas (Chrysander)

References
Citations

Sources

 
Compositions with a spurious or doubtful attribution